Bonnie Doon Shopping Centre is a shopping centre in Edmonton, Alberta, at the intersection of Whyte Avenue and 83 Street in the Bonnie Doon neighbourhood. It has over 60 shops and services including Dollarama, Shoppers Drug Mart, Stitches Factory Outlet, and Safeway. Former tenants include Sears Canada, Target Canada, Sport Mart, Blockbuster LLC, and Zellers.   It is managed by Morguard.

History
It was built in 1958.

Former tenants
Zellers (closed 2012)
Target Canada (closed Sunday, March 15, 2015, now Stitches Factory Outlet/Planet Fitness)
Sears Canada (closed Friday, December 24, 2016, now Makami College)
SuperValu (closed 1980s, sat vacant for years, before Safeway moved from the other end of the mall to take over this spot when the mall was overhauled in the mid-1990s)
Sport Mart
Blockbuster
Albert's Family Restaurant
Tony Roma's

Current Anchors
Stitches Factory Outlet/Planet Fitness
MaKami College
Shoppers Drug Mart
Safeway

Transportation
Public transit is provided by Edmonton Transit and Strathcona County Transit. The shopping centre will be accessible to the Edmonton LRT Valley Line via the Bonnie Doon stop, which will open in 2023.

References

External links
Official Website

Shopping malls in Edmonton